is a Japanese manga artist. He is best known as the author of the long-running series Shura no Mon and its prequel Shura no Toki, for which he won the Kodansha Manga Award for shōnen in 1989.

References

External links
 Profile at the Ultimate Manga Page

1960 births
Living people
Manga artists from Hiroshima Prefecture
Winner of Kodansha Manga Award (Shōnen)